WNGZ may refer to:

 WNGZ (AM), a radio station (1490 AM) licensed to serve Watkins Glen, New York, United States
 WCIM (FM), a radio station (104.9 FM) licensed to serve Montour Falls, New York, which held the call sign WNGZ from 1982 to 2020